Neoclytus vitellinus is a species of beetle in the family Cerambycidae. It was described by Martins and Galileo in 2008.

References

Neoclytus
Beetles described in 2008